POPiS was a coalition of Civic Platform (PO) and Law and Justice (PiS) in 2002 Polish local elections and predicted coalition above all in the 2005 Polish parliamentary election. Following Law and Justice' victory at the 2005 elections, with Civic Platform achieving second place, the two parties attempted to negotiate a coalition agreement, but the negotiations fell through and the coalition never eventuated. In May 2006, Law and Justice instead successfully negotiated a coalition agreement with the controversial Samoobrona and League of Polish Families parties.

Since the failed negotiations between the two parties in 2005/2006, the Civic Platform and Law and Justice have become bitter opponents. The Polish political scene has since been dominated by the rivalry of these two groups. The prospects of any collaboration between these two parties in the immediate future appear to be slight.

The Polish word popis means a 'show' or 'display', and is now used mostly in an ironic context.

References 

Elections in Poland
History of Poland (1989–present)
Law and Justice
Civic Platform